Silverline Helicopters Inc. is a Canadian helicopter operator based in Holland Landing, at the Holland Landing Airpark (CLA4), Ontario Canada. Silverline Helicopters provides charter flights within areas including tourism, sightseeing, utility work, patrol, aerial firefighting and helicopter training.

Silverline was established in 1999 to provide flight training with a Schweitzer 300B. It later expanded to provide helicopter charters.

Fleet
As of September 2019, the following were registered with Transport Canada:

References

Regional airlines of Ontario